The Petrov–Galerkin method  is a mathematical method used to approximate solutions of partial differential equations which contain terms with odd order and where the test function and solution function belong to different function spaces.  It can be viewed as an extension of Bubnov-Galerkin method where the  bases of test functions and solution functions are the same. In an operator formulation of the differential equation, Petrov–Galerkin method can be viewed as applying a projection that is not necessarily orthogonal, in contrast to Bubnov-Galerkin method.

Introduction with an abstract problem
Petrov-Galerkin's method is a natural extension of Galerkin method and can be similarly introduced as follows.

A problem in weak formulation
 find  such that  for all .

Petrov-Galerkin dimension reduction
 Find  such that  for all .

We notice that the equation has remained unchanged and only the spaces have changed.

Petrov-Galerkin generalized orthogonality
The key property of the Petrov-Galerkin approach is that the error is in some sense "orthogonal" to the chosen subspaces. Since  , we can use  as a test vector in the original equation. Subtracting the two, we get the relation for the error,  which is the error between the solution of the original problem, and the solution of the Galerkin equation, as follows

 for all .

Matrix form
Since the aim of the approximation is producing a linear system of equations, we build its matrix form, which can be used to compute the solution algorithmically.

Then, it is sufficient to use these in turn for testing the Galerkin equation, i.e.: find  such that

We expand  with respect to the solution basis,  and insert it into the equation above, to obtain

This previous equation is actually a linear system of equations , where

Symmetry of the matrix

See also 
 Bubnov-Galerkin method

Notes

Partial differential equations